Abdalla Ahmed Bekhit (born October 10, 1983) is an Egyptian indoor volleyball player. He was included as part of the Egypt national team at the 2008 Summer Olympics. Ahmed was named to the all-tournament team at the FIVB World Grand Champions Cup. He is a setter.  He was part of the Egypt men's national volleyball team at the 2010 FIVB Volleyball Men's World Championship in Italy. He played for Al Ahly SC.

Sporting achievements

Clubs 

 Al Ahly SC  :

-  11 × Egyptian Volleyball League : 2001/02, 2002/03, 2003/04, 2005/06, 2009/10, 2012/13, 2013/14, 2017/18, 2018/19, 2019/20 , 2020/21

-  10 × Egyptian Volleyball Cup : 2001/02, 2002/03, 2003/04,2004/05, 2005/06, 2009/10, 2012/13, 2017/18, 2018/19, 2019/20.

-  7 × African Clubs Championship (volleyball) : 2003 - 2004 - 2006- 2010 - 2018 - 2019 - 2022

-  6 × Arab Clubs Championship (volleyball) : 2002 - 2004 - 2006- 2010 - 2020 - 2023 .

 Sisley Treviso  :

-  1 × Italian Volleyball League : 2006/07.

-  1 × Coppa Italia (volleyball) : 2006/07.

 AL GAISH  :

-  2 × Egyptian Volleyball League : 2015/16 , 2016/2017.

-  2 × Egyptian Volleyball Cup : 2014/15, 2016/17.

-  1 × African Clubs Championship (volleyball) : 2016

 AL BOUCHRIA Club   Loan for Playoffs

-  1 × Lebanese Volleyball League : 2013/14

National team

  6 × Men's African Volleyball Championship : 2005 - 2007 - 2009-2011-2013-2015
  1 × Volleyball at the 2005 Mediterranean Games : 2005
  2 × African Games : 2003 - 2007
 5th place at 2005 FIVB Volleyball Men's World Grand Champions Cup
  1 × Arab Games : 2006

Individually
 2001 Best Server at 2001 FIVB Volleyball Boys' U19 World Championship
 2005 Best server at 2005 FIVB Volleyball Men's World Grand Champions Cup
 2005 Best server & Best setter at 2005 Men's African Volleyball Championship
 2007 Best server & MVP at 2007 Men's African Volleyball Championship
 2007 MVP at Coppa Italia
 2009 Best setter at 2009 Men's African Volleyball Championship
 2011 Best setter at 2011 Men's African Volleyball Championship
 2017 Best Server at 2017 Men's African Volleyball Championship
 2017 MVP at African Clubs Championship (volleyball)

References

 http://www.fivb.org/en/Volleyball/Competitions/GrandChampionCup/2005/men/standings_page1.asp
 https://www.kingfut.com/2018/04/05/al-ahly-african-champions-el-geish/
 http://www.legavolley.it/Statistiche.asp?TipoStat=2.2&Atleta=AHM-ABD-83&AnnoInizio=2006&Giornata=2215&Serie=1

External links
 http://www.fivb.org/en/Volleyball/Competitions/GrandChampionCup/2005/men/standings_page1.asp
 https://www.kingfut.com/2018/04/05/al-ahly-african-champions-el-geish/

1983 births
Egyptian men's volleyball players
Al Ahly (men's volleyball) players
Living people
Olympic volleyball players of Egypt
Mediterranean Games medalists in volleyball
Mediterranean Games gold medalists for Egypt
Competitors at the 2005 Mediterranean Games
African Games gold medalists for Egypt
African Games medalists in volleyball
Competitors at the 2003 All-Africa Games
Competitors at the 2007 All-Africa Games
Volleyball players at the 2008 Summer Olympics